Vikas Dahiya is an Indian field hockey player and plays as a goalkeeper in the Indian national team

Achievements
 Vikas Dahiya has 24 international caps .
 He was awarded the best goalkeeper of the tournament at Junior Asia Cup, 2015.
 He saved 2 goals in the penalty shootout against Australia at the semi-final stage in Junior Hockey World Cup 2016 to help India reach the finals. He was awarded Man of the Match for his brilliant performance.

International
 Vikas was a part of the Indian hockey squad for Rio Olympics, 2016.
 Silver at the 2016 SAF Games in Guwahati.
 Silver at Champions Trophy London, 2016.
 Gold at Junior Asia Cup 2015.
 Gold at Junior Hockey World Cup 2016.

References

External links

1995 births
Living people
Field hockey players from Haryana
South Asian Games silver medalists for India
South Asian Games medalists in field hockey